Rivington Martin Bisland was a professional baseball player. He played parts of three seasons in Major League Baseball for three teams between 1912 and 1914, primarily as a shortstop.

During his brief major league career, Bisland seemed to be the very definition of good-field, no-hit, recording an above-average fielding percentage while batting just .118.

Sources

Major League Baseball shortstops
Cleveland Naps players
Pittsburgh Pirates players
St. Louis Browns players
Wheeling Stogies players
Springfield Reapers players
Atlanta Crackers players
Baseball players from New York (state)
1890 births
1973 deaths
Indianapolis Indians players